"You Make It Real" is the sixth single by English singer James Morrison, and the first from his second album, Songs for You, Truths for Me. The single was released on 22 September 2008; a week before the release of the album. The song was covered by Akon on the Live Lounge on BBC Radio 1. The song appeared on the international soundtrack to the Brazilian soap opera Três Irmãs, and on the soundtrack for the film, He's Just Not That Into You. It was also featured on a commercial for Overstock.com, as well as being featured on the first episode in Season 5 of the television programme Brothers and Sisters.

Music video
The video was released in September and showed Morrison in places throughout Los Angeles. One shot, shows the sign for the "110 Freeway" which runs through the Downtown Los Angeles area. The video begins with Morrison inside a cab, and then by a pool, meanwhile, he arrives at a hotel, and then him singing on stage. The video also has shots of Morrison in a bar and coffee-shop. The video ends with him walking alone.

Formats and track listings
CD single
 "You Make It Real"
 "Sitting on a Platform"
Maxi-CD single
 "You Make It Real" (Radio version)
 "Sitting on a Platform"
 "Movin' On"
 "You Make It Real" (Live and acoustic)
 "You Make It Real" (Video)

Charts

Chart performance
The song debuted in the UK Singles Chart at number seven on 28 September 2008, giving Morrison his third top ten hit and it spent eight weeks in the chart. The song also broke in the top twenty of the Dutch Top 40, peaking at number eighteen. The song also appeared in the lower reaches of several European music charts

Weekly charts

Year-end charts

References

2008 singles
James Morrison (singer) songs
Songs written by James Morrison (singer)
Songs written by Paul Barry (songwriter)
Song recordings produced by Mark Taylor (record producer)
2008 songs
Polydor Records singles